The 2005–06 Illinois State Redbirds men's basketball team represented Illinois State University during the 2005–06 NCAA Division I men's basketball season. The Redbirds, led by third year head coach Porter Moser, played their home games at Redbird Arena and competed as a member of the Missouri Valley Conference.

They finished the season 9–19, 4–14 in conference play to finish in a tie for ninth place. They were the number ten seed for the Missouri Valley Conference tournament. They were defeated by the University of Evansville in their opening round game.

Roster

Schedule

|-
!colspan=9 style=|Exhibition Season

|-
!colspan=9 style=|Regular Season

|-
!colspan=9 style=|Missouri Valley Conference (MVC) tournament

References

Illinois State Redbirds men's basketball seasons
Illinois State
Illinois State Redbirds Men's
Illinois State Redbirds Men's